Straheden may refer to:-

Stratheden, Fife, a hamlet 2 miles west of Cupar, and just north of Springfield, in Fife, Scotland.
Stratheden, New South Wales, a locality in the Richmond Valley, New South Wales, Australia.
SS Stratheden or HMT Stratheden, a P&O passenger liner, troop transport and cruise ship launched in 1937 and scrapped in 1969